BASE Productions is a production company founded in 1992 by John Brenkus and Mickey Stern. As a producer of reality, documentary, and unscripted infotainment programming,  BASE Productions uses a trademark motion-capture and CGI technology. The company has produced programming for a variety of channels, such as A&E, Animal Planet, the Discovery Channel networks, Fox Sports Net,  G4, ESPN, HBO, MTV, National Geographic Channel and Spike TV. BASE Productions is located in Los Angeles and Washington DC.

Chief executive officers

John Brenkus serves as the co-CEO, as well as the host of Sport Science. During the early years of his career, Brenkus produced numerous short films and music video projects before launching full-time into film and television writing, production and direction. John Brenkus is based in Los Angeles.

Mickey Stern is the co-CEO and also headlines the business, legal and financial aspects of BASE Productions. He is based in Washington, D.C.

John Davis is the Executive Vice President working closely with Brenkus and Stern headlining the business, legal, financial and creative aspects of BASE Productions. He is based in Los Angeles.

Robert Curran is the Executive Vice President of Development and is responsible for creative development and production management, and serves as Executive Producer on many BASE Productions projects.

Productions

TV series
 Fact or Faked (2012), Reality, SyFy
 Stunt Busters (2011), Reality, Speed
 Car Warriors (2011), Reality, Speed
 Car Science (2011), Reality, Speed
 Last American Cowboy (2010) Reality, Animal Planet
  I, Predator (2011) Reality, Animal Planet
 Jesse James Is a Dead Man (2009) Reality, Spike TV, starring television personality Jesse James, premiered on May 31, 2009 on Spike TV to the most viewers and highest rating for an unscripted series premiere among the 18-49 male demographic. In the finale of the first season, Jesse James sets the land speed record for a hydrogen powered vehicle.
 Strong Men (2009-current) Reality, National Geographic Channel
 Crime 360 (2008- current) Reality, A&E
 Human Wrecking Balls (2008-2010) Reality, G4
 Known Universe (2008-current) Reality, National Geographic Channel
 Sport Science (2007- current) Reality, ESPN, tests such theories and practices as female versus male Muay Thai. The show ran for two seasons on Fox Sports Net before being picked up by ESPN in January 2010.
 Fight Science (2006- current) Reality, National Geographic Channel
 Deep South Paranormal (2013-) Paranormal, SyFy

References

External links
Los Angeles Times Kevin Love looks to go the distance on FSN's Sport Science
 Oregon Live 'Sport Science' host takes great pains for 'good TV'
 Tampa Bay Online 'Sport Science': Skull Breaks Like a Coconut
Tulsa World Bring the Pain: TV Host Dives into The Brutal Force of Pro Sports
Variety FSN to Sport more 'Science'
USA Today Zany Sports Science Show Answers Questions You Never Had

Mass media companies based in Washington, D.C.
Mass media companies established in 1992